Gilberto "Pulpo" Colón Jr. (Born December 28, 1953) is a pianist, composer, and band leader. He is credited for working with all three of the "Big 3" (Tito Puente, Tito Rodriguez, & Machito Orchestras).

Early musical influences
Colón's family moved to the United States from Puerto Rico in the 1940s and immediately settled in the Bronx. Colón's early musical influences ranged from The Beatles, Elvis Presley to Puerto Rican “Jibaro” music. He formally began his musical career at the age of 14. After experimenting with various instruments, Colón joined his close friend Oscar Hernández (musician) with piano lessons. Under the tutelage of piano luminary Charlie Palmieri, Colón quickly learned the essential skills needed to succeed in the competitive industry. As a teenager, Colón was beginning to play playing at the epicenter of Salsa's Golden Age.

Recording debut
After playing New York City's Latin circuit, Colón joined the young orchestra of Rafi Val y La Diferente. It was with La Diferente where Colón made his recording debut on the self-titled album (1971). Colón continued to perform and record on the subsequent La Diferente albums (La Sociedad '72, Fuerza Bruta '74). Following his time with La Diferente, Colón began working consistently with Louie Ramirez, Justo Betancourt, Marty Galagarza y La Conquistadora, Joe Cuba, and Andy Harlow.

Héctor Lavoe years

In the winter of 1975 Colón was approached by Héctor Lavoe to join his orchestra. Colón's first recording with Lavoe was in 1977 on the acclaimed Fania Records album Comedia (album). Colón's extended piano solo on the song 'Bandolera' earned him the award of 'Best Latin Piano Solo of the Year'. Initially awarded to former Lavoe pianist Professor Joe Torres due to an editorial mistake the award bolted Colón to the forefront of Latin Music's notable musicians. Today, this is still considered one of the most historic piano solos ever recorded on a commercial salsa album. Colon served as Lavoe's Pianist and Musical Director for 16 years performing and traveling the world with the Salsa Icon.

Along with Lavoe and the “Big 3”, Colón has performed & recorded with Latin music's most popular artists including Adalberto Santiago, Kako (musician), Pete "El Conde" Rodríguez, La Bruja, and many more.

Recordings
Colón recorded on the following recordings (In chronological order):
 Rafi Val y La Diferente; Self Titled - Gilberto Colón Jr., Piano
 Rafi Val y La Diferente; La Sociedad - Gilberto Colón Jr., Piano
 Marty Galargarza y La Conquistadora; Pinocho - Gilberto Colón Jr., Piano
 Rafi Val y La Diferente; Fuerza Bruta - Gilberto Colón Jr., Piano
 Alfredo "Chocolate" Armenteros; Caliente - Gilberto Colón Jr., Piano
 Andy Harlow, La Musica Brava - Gilberto Colón Jr., Piano
 Alfredo "Chocolate" Armenteros; Chocolate En El Rincon - Gilberto Colón Jr., Piano
 Charanga 76'; Self Titled - Gilberto Colón Jr., Piano
 Pete "El Conde Rodriguez; A Touch of Class - Gilberto Colón Jr., Piano
 Hector Lavoe; Comedia - Gilberto Colón Jr., Piano
 Tito Rodriguez Jr; Curious? Canta: José Alberto "El Canario" - Gilberto Colón Jr., Piano
 Latin Percussion, Drum Solos, Volume 1 - Gilberto Colón Jr., Piano
 Latin Percussion, Drum Solos, Volume 2 - Gilberto Colón Jr., Piano
 Latin Percussion, Drum Solos, Volume 3 - Gilberto Colón Jr., Piano
 Hector Lavoe; Recordando a Felipe Pirela - Gilberto Colón Jr., Piano
 Orquesta Novel; A Novel Experience - Gilberto Colón Jr., Piano
 La Salsa Mayor; Fuerte y Caliente - Gilberto Colón Jr., Piano
 Hector Lavoe; El Sabio - Gilberto Colón Jr., Piano
 Don Gonzalo Fernandez Presenta Miguel Quintana - Gilberto Colón Jr., Piano
 Charanga La Tapa; Charanga - Gilberto Colón Jr., Piano
 Hector Lavoe; Que Sentimientos - Gilberto Colón Jr., Piano
 Machito & Salsa Big Band; Live at North Sea '82 - Gilberto Colón Jr., Piano
 Louie Ramirez; Con Cache - Gilberto Colón Jr., Piano
 Frankie Morales; En Su Punto - Gilberto Colón Jr., Piano
 Frankie Morales; Sobresaliendo - Gilberto Colón Jr., Piano
 Hector Lavoe; Live - Gilberto Colón Jr., Piano
 Adalberto Santiago; Mas Sabroso - Gilberto Colón Jr., Piano
 Junior Gonzalez; Tribute To Héctor Lavoe - Gilberto Colón Jr., Piano
 Adalberto Santiago; Cosas Del Alma - Gilberto Colón Jr., Piano
 En Vivo: A.J. Diaz Y Son De La Calle Homenaje Postume A Celia Cruz Y Tito Puente - Gilberto Colón Jr., Piano
 Pulpo; Hot Bread - Gilberto Colón Jr., Piano, Musical Director, Arranger

Hot Bread
Colón recorded and released his first solo album titled 'Hot Bread' which won the 2009 Independent Music Award's 'Best Latin Album'. The project featured some of the best musicians in Latin music, receiving critical acclaim.

References

External links 
 Official Website

1953 births
Living people
Latin jazz musicians
American bandleaders
American musicians of Puerto Rican descent
American salsa musicians